Warnant is a village of Wallonia and a district of the municipality of Anhée, located in the province of Namur, Belgium. 

Until 1977, it was a separate municipality.

This village also includes the nearby hamlet of Salet.

Sub-municipalities of Anhée
Former municipalities of Namur (province)